Anne's Beach is located at Lower Matecumbe Key, Florida. The Islamorada Beach is dedicated to local environmentalist Anne Eaton. There are 2 parking lots approximately 1/4 mile apart on US-1 at MM 73. Anne's Beach features a shallow swimming area, covered picnic tables, boardwalk and bathroom facilities.

This Keys Beach is located on the Atlantic Ocean, but there is almost no wave action, due to the wide expanse of shallow water typical for Florida Keys beaches. 

Typical of Anne's Beach is the shallow and warm to very warm waters all year around. The sandbar is composed entirely of calcium carbonate.

Anne's Beach is a popular destination for kiteboarders, and due to its wide expanse of shallow water, it presents a good learning environment for beginning kiteboarders.

References

External links 
Anne's Beach description

Florida Keys
Beaches of Monroe County, Florida
Beaches of Florida